Shamineau Lake is a lake in Morrison County, in the U.S. state of Minnesota.

Shamineau (or Shamano) was the name of a local Native American (Indian).

See also
List of lakes in Minnesota

References

Lakes of Minnesota
Lakes of Morrison County, Minnesota